Gunsan Port Line() is a cargo branch line from Janghang Line, connecting from Daeya station to Gunsan Port station. It is located in the city of Gunsan, North Jeolla Province, South Korea

See also
 Korail
 Gunsan Hwamul Line
 Okgu Line

References 

Railway lines opened in 2020